Torre del Café, also known as Edificio del Café, is a 36-storey high-rise commercial office skyscraper in the city municipality of Medellín, Colombia. Although the starting date of its construction is unknown, the Torre del Café was completed in 1975.

See also
Cali Tower
Coltejer Building
Torre Colpatria
Centro de Comercio Internacional
Medellín

References

External links

Buildings and structures in Medellín
Office buildings completed in 1975
Skyscraper office buildings in Colombia